The 1990 Mazda Women's World Open Squash Championship was the women's edition of the 1990 World Open, which serves as the individual world championship for squash players. The early stages of the event took place at the Thornleigh Squash Centre with the quarter finals onwards being held at the Homebush Sports Centre in Sydney, Australia between 6 March and 14 March 1990. Susan Devoy won her third World Open title, defeating Martine Le Moignan in the final.

Seeds

First round

Second round

Third round to final

See also
World Open
1990 Men's World Open Squash Championship

Notes
The early rounds of the championship were held at the Thornleigh Squash Centre with the quarter-finals, semi-finals and final played at the Homebush Sports Centre. The tournament had the largest ever entry for a world championship with 121 players entered.

References

External links
Womens World Open

1990 in squash
World Squash Championships
1990 in Australian sport
Squash tournaments in Australia
Sports competitions in Sydney
1990 in women's squash
International sports competitions hosted by Australia
1990s in Sydney
March 1990 sports events in Australia